Kohistani Shina is an Indo-Aryan language spoken in the former Kohistan District of Khyber Pakhtunkhwa, northern Pakistan. According to Ethnologue, Kohistani Shina is mutually intelligible with the Shina variety of Chilas, but not with the standard dialect of Gilgit. Bateri and Kalkoti speakers speak Kohistani Shina as a second language. Indus Kohistani loanwords can be found in the language. A grammar and a dictionary of the language have been published.

Alphabet 
Here is the alphabet for Kohistani Shina compiled by Razwal Kohistani in 2020.

References 

Kohistan District, Pakistan
Languages of Khyber Pakhtunkhwa